The Rural Municipality of Viscount No. 341 is a rural municipality (RM) in the Canadian province of Saskatchewan within Census Division No. 11 and  Division No. 5. It is located in the central portion of the province.

History 
The RM of Viscount No. 341 incorporated as a rural municipality on December 13, 1909.

Geography

Communities and localities 
The following urban municipalities are surrounded by the RM.

Villages
 Plunkett
 Viscount

The following unincorporated communities are within the RM.

Localities
 Sclanders

Demographics 

Government 
The RM of Viscount No. 341 is governed by an elected municipal council and an appointed administrator that meets on the second Tuesday of every month. The reeve of the RM is Gordon Gusikoski while its administrator is Joni Mack. The RM's office is located in Viscount.

References 

Viscount
Division No. 11, Saskatchewan